is a Japanese footballer currently playing as a midfielder for Kyoto Sanga.

Career statistics

Club
.

Notes

References

External links

2001 births
Living people
People from Nagaoka, Niigata
Sportspeople from Niigata Prefecture
Association football people from Niigata Prefecture
Japanese footballers
Japan youth international footballers
Association football midfielders
J2 League players
Kyoto Sanga FC players